Insomnia is Good for You is a 1957 British short comedy film directed by Leslie Arliss and starring Peter Sellers as Hector Dimwittie. It was produced and released by Park Lane Films, and written by Lewis Griefer and Mordecai Richler.

As of December 2012, the film was considered lost by rare book and script collector and actor Neil Pearson, with no cast list (apart from Sellers), script or footage known to exist. Nevertheless, a copy had been found in 1996, in a skip outside the offices of the film company, together with Dearth of a Salesman (also 1957). It was shown at the Southend Film Festival in May 2014.

References

External links
 

1957 films
1957 comedy films
1957 short films
British comedy short films
1950s English-language films
1950s British films